The play-offs of the 2017 Fed Cup Europe/Africa Zone Group III were the final stages of the Group III zonal competition involving teams from Europe and Africa. Using the positions determined in their pools, the fifteen teams faced off to determine their placing in the 2017 Fed Cup Europe/Africa Zone Group III. The top two teams advanced to Fed Cup Europe/Africa Zone Group II.

Promotional play-offs 
The first placed teams of each pool were drawn in head-to-head rounds. The winners advanced to Group II in 2018.

Greece vs. Finland

Cyprus vs. Moldova

5th to 8th play-offs 
The second placed teams of each pool were drawn in head-to-head rounds to find the equal fifth and seventh placed teams.

Malta vs. Tunisia

Ireland vs. Morocco

9th to 12th play-offs 
The third placed teams of each pool were drawn in head-to-head rounds to find the equal ninth and eleventh placed teams.

Armenia vs. Macedonia

Kenya vs. Algeria

13th to 14th play-offs 
The fourth placed teams of each pool were drawn in head-to-head rounds to find the thirteenth and equal fourteenth placed teams.

Iceland vs. Mozambique

Final placements 

References

External links 
 Fed Cup website

P3